Gornje Mladice is a village in Bosnia and Herzegovina. According to the 1991 census, the village is located in the municipality of Istočna Ilidža.

References

Populated places in Istočna Ilidža
Villages in Republika Srpska